Numanggang (Manggang) is a language of Papua New Guinea. Other names are Boana, Kai, Ngain, Sugu. Numanggang is preferred over Tok Pisin in the village court because its use is believed to have a calming effect on proceedings.

The letter Ɋ
The letter Ɋ, also known as Q with hook tail, was introduced by Lutheran missionaries in Papua New Guinea for use in the Numanggang language in the 1930s or 1940s. In 2002, it was decided to discontinue using Q with hook tail.

References

Languages of Papua New Guinea